Aloke Lohia (born 1958) is an Indian billionaire businessman, and the founder and CEO of Indorama Ventures.

Early & personal life

Lohia was educated at Delhi University, where he received a bachelor of commerce degree. Lohia is married to Suchitra Lohia, a director and vice chairman of the Indorama Ventures. They have a daughter and two sons together.

Career

From 1979 to 1987, Lohia was the finance director of P.T. Indorama Synthetics, Indonesia.

In 1988, he moved to Thailand, where he founded Indorama Chemicals (now known as Aurus Specialty Company Limited) to turn corncobs into furfural alcohol, supported financially by the German Investment Corporation.

Lohia started Thailand's first wool business under the name Indorama Holdings in 1994 before starting Thailand's first PET (Polyethylene Terephthalate) business, Indorama Polymers, in 1995.

In February 2010, Lohia delisted Indorama Polymers and simultaneously listed its parent company Indorama Ventures on the Stock Exchange of Thailand. Indorama Ventures' revenue was approximately $7.5 billion at the end of 2014.

As of May 2021, his net worth was estimated at US$2.6 billion.

Recognition
In 2011, Lohia was appointed an honorary investment advisor to the Government of Thailand.
In 2011–2014, Lohia was included in the Top 40 Power Players by ICIS (Independent Chemical Information Service), the world's largest petrochemical market information provider.

References

1958 births
Living people
Indian chief executives
Businesspeople from Kolkata
Rajasthani people
Aloke Lohia
Aloke Lohia
Aloke Lohia
Indian billionaires
Delhi University alumni
Aloke